Goa does not recognise same-sex marriages or civil unions.

Legal history

Background
Marriage in India is governed under several federal laws. These laws allow for the solemnisation of marriages according to different religions. Every citizen has the right to choose which law will apply to them based on their community or religion. These laws are the Hindu Marriage Act, 1955, which governs matters of marriage, separation and divorce for Hindus according to Hindu custom and rites, the Indian Christian Marriage Act, 1872, which regulates the marriage and divorce of Christians, the Muslim Personal Law (Shariat) Application Act, 1937, for matters concerning the marriage, succession and inheritance of Muslims, the Parsi Marriage and Divorce Act, 1936, concerning the marriage and divorce of Parsis, the Anand Marriage Act, 1909, concerning the marriage of Sikhs, and the Special Marriage Act, 1954 (SMA). The SMA allows all Indian citizens to marry regardless of the religion of either party. Marriages contracted under the SMA are registered with the state as a civil contract. The Act applies to partners of all religions or with no religious beliefs as well as to interfaith couples. None of these acts explicitly bans same-sex marriage.

Goa is unique among the states of India in being the only one to have a unified marriage law. Every citizen is bound to the same law regardless of their religion. However, article 1056 of the Goa Civil Code, largely based on Portuguese civil law, defines marriage as a "perpetual contract made between two persons of different sex with the purpose of legitimately constituting a family". Marriages are solemnised before officials of the Civil Registration Services according to the conditions established in the law. Article 1058, which lists forbidden marriages such as marriages to relatives or to individuals under the marriageable age, does not explicitly ban marriages between people of the same sex.

Non-legally recognised marriage ceremonies
Reported in the media as "India's first gay marriage", designer Wendell Rodricks and his French partner, Jerome Marrel, entered into a civil solidarity pact (PACS), a French civil union scheme, in 2002. Rodricks later reported that the evening of the signing of the PACS 8 "scruffy-looking men" came to the couple's house in Colvale. Although he anticipated trouble, the men instead said "Landlord, you are getting married and not buying us a round of drinks?" Scroll.in reported this history in 2022 as an "early sign" on how Goans would "overcome prejudice to open [their] arms to the queer community".

In 2006, a local LGBT advocacy group stated that in the past two years they had conducted 25 same-sex marriages, though the marriages lack legal recognition. "Fearing social stigma and discrimination, we had to conduct all these marriages in a clandestine manner.", said a spokesman for the group. In 2022, a lesbian couple, Dr. Paromita Mukherjee and Dr. Surabhi Mitra, orginially from Nagpur, Maharashtra, had a "big, fat, sea-side destination wedding" in Goa. The couple went public with the news of their wedding. Mukherjee said, "We are over the moon with the love we are garnering. Somewhere we knew that the society and its aware people will celebrate our love with us."

See also
Recognition of same-sex unions in India
Supriyo v. Union Of India

Notes

References

Goa
Politics of Goa